Pavlo Mykolayovych Kikot (born 27 September 1967, Kiev, Ukrainian SSR) is a former Soviet and Ukrainian footballer and football coach.

Career
Since 2016 till January 2017 he worked a coach of Sumy.

References

External links
 

1967 births
Living people
Footballers from Kyiv
Soviet footballers
Soviet expatriate footballers
Expatriate footballers in Czechoslovakia
Expatriate footballers in Slovakia
Ukrainian footballers
Ukrainian expatriate footballers
Soviet expatriate sportspeople in Czechoslovakia
Ukrainian expatriate sportspeople in Slovakia
FC Systema-Boreks Borodianka players
FC Ros Bila Tserkva players
FC Sula Lubny players
MFK Vranov nad Topľou players
3. Liga (Slovakia) players
FC Obolon-Brovar Kyiv players
FC Dnipro Kyiv players
Ukrainian football managers
PFC Sumy managers
FC Dnipro Kyiv managers
FC Interkas Kyiv managers
Association football defenders